Keilite is an iron-magnesium sulfide mineral with the chemical formula  that is found in enstatite chondrites. Keilite is the iron-dominant analog of niningerite.  Keilite is named after Klaus Keil (born 1934).

Occurrences
Examples of keilite occurrences are enstatite chondrites and the Zakłodzie meteorite. It appears to be confined to impact-melt influenced enstatite chondrites that were quenched. There are also some meteorites interpreted as impact-melt breccias that don't contain keilite. This is explained as a deeper burial after impact, which slowed cooling and enabled retrograde reactions (diapthoresis) to take place.

References

Galena group
Iron(II) minerals
Magnesium minerals
Cubic minerals
Minerals in space group 225